Scabricola desetangsii is a species of sea snail, a marine gastropod mollusc in the family Mitridae, the miters or miter snails.

Description
The length of the shell attains 28.4 mm.

Distribution
This species occurs in the Indian Ocean off Mauritius Island.
Pacific Ocean at Guam.

References

 Kiener, L.-C., 1838-39 Genre Mitra. Volume 3. In: Species général et iconographie des coquilles vivantes, p. 120 pp
 Vine, P. (1986). Red Sea Invertebrates. Immel Publishing, London. 224 pp.
 Cernohorsky W.O. (1991). The Mitridae of the world. Part 2. The subfamily Mitrinae concluded and subfamilies Imbricariinae and Cylindromitrinae. Monographs of Marine Mollusca. 4: ii + 164 pp.
 Liu, J.Y. [Ruiyu] (ed.). (2008). Checklist of marine biota of China seas. China Science Press. 1267 pp
 Poppe G.T. & Tagaro S.P. (2008). Mitridae. Pp. 330-417, in: G.T. Poppe (ed.), Philippine marine mollusks, volume 2. Hackenheim: ConchBooks. 848 pp.

External links
 Kiener L.C. (1834-1841). Spécies général et iconographie des coquilles. Vol. 3. Famille des Columellaires. Genres Mitre (Mitra), Lamarck, pp. 1-120, pl. 1-34
 Reeve, L. A. (1844-1845). Monograph of the genus Mitra. In: Conchologia Iconica, or, illustrations of the shells of molluscous animals, vol. 2, pl. 1-39 and unpaginated text. L. Reeve & Co., London
 Fedosov A., Puillandre N., Herrmann M., Kantor Yu., Oliverio M., Dgebuadze P., Modica M.V. & Bouchet P. (2018). The collapse of Mitra: molecular systematics and morphology of the Mitridae (Gastropoda: Neogastropoda). Zoological Journal of the Linnean Society. 183(2): 253-337

Mitridae
Gastropods described in 1838